Slaughter Mountain, with an elevation of , is the ninth-highest peak in the U.S. state of Georgia. It is located in Union County, Georgia and is the second-highest mountain in Union County.  Its nearest neighbor is Blood Mountain, the highest peak in Union County and fifth-highest in Georgia.

Slaughter Mountain was named in commemoration of a bloody battle between the Cherokee and Creek Indians.

See also
List of mountains in Georgia (U.S. state)

References

External links 

 100 highest peaks in Georgia

Mountains of Georgia (U.S. state)
Mountains of Union County, Georgia